The Dr. James Madison Jackson Office is a historic site in Miami, Florida. It is located at 190 Southeast 12th Terrace. The first resident physician of Miami, Dr. James M. Jackson, had his office and surgery in this building. More recently, it became the offices of the Dade Heritage Trust. On February 24, 1975, the structure was added to the U.S. National Register of Historic Places. The building is located in the center of Brickell, near Downtown Miami. A great nephew, James Madison Barco, is named for Dr. Jackson

References

External links

 Dade County listings at National Register of Historic Places
 Florida's Office of Cultural and Historical Programs
 Dade County listings
 Miami - DR. JAMES M. JACKSON OFFICE
 
 

Office buildings in Miami
National Register of Historic Places in Miami